A tourist trap is an establishment (or group of establishments) that has been created or re-purposed with the aim of attracting tourists and their money. Tourist traps will typically provide overpriced services, entertainment, food, souvenirs and other products for tourists to purchase. Tourist trap derives from the information asymmetry between tourists and the market.

United States

In some areas, simple facilities may be a sufficient draw to entice tourists to stop. Wall Drug, in South Dakota, began its tourist trade by offering free ice water.

Breezewood, Pennsylvania represents a physical tourist trap at the intersection of Interstate 70 and Interstate 76, where the two major highways are not directly connected; forcing transiting drivers off the interstate and "into several suddenly urban blocks with traffic lights and a dense bazaar of gas stations, fast food restaurants and motels."

South of the Border is an attraction on Interstate 95 (I-95), US Highway 301 (US 301) and US 501 in Dillon, South Carolina, just south of Rowland, North Carolina. It is so named because it is just south of the border between North Carolina and South Carolina, and was the half way point to Florida from New York in the early days of motor travel. The area is themed in tongue-in-cheek, faux-Mexican style. The rest area contains restaurants, gas stations, a video arcade, a motel, a truck stop as well as a small amusement park, a mini golf course, shopping and fireworks stores. Its mascot is Pedro, a caricature of a Mexican bandido. South of the Border is known for its roadside billboard advertisements, which begin many miles away from, and incorporates a mileage countdown to the attraction itself. The stop has since fallen on hard times as more modern hotel areas have grown along I-95.

Alice's Restaurant, a restaurant in Sky Londa, California named after its founder Alice Taylor, accidentally became a tourist trap after singer Arlo Guthrie released his signature song of the same name, which was based on a totally unrelated Massachusetts restaurant established by Alice Brock. After Taylor sold the restaurant, her successors themed the restaurant after the song, adding a "Group W bench" for example, when they realized the confusion was good for business.

A few establishments take pride in the term and embody it into their names, such as "Da Yoopers Tourist Trap", run by the comedy troupe Da Yoopers in Michigan’s Upper Peninsula, and "The Tourist Trap" at Deep Creek Lake, Maryland.

See also 

Gift shop
List of confidence tricks
Lists of tourist attractions
Overtourism
Roadside attraction
Tourist attraction

References

Tourist attractions